Jan Hajek is a Czech scientist and mathematician, living in the Netherlands. He participated in the creation of the TCP/IP protocol. He also created 'Approver', "which was probably the first tool for the automated verification of concurrent systems".

Hajek is best known for his work Probabilistic causation indicated by relative risk, attributable risk and by formulas of I.J. Good, Kemeny, Popper, Sheps/Cheng, Pearl and Google's Brin, for data mining, epidemiology, evidence-based medicine, economy, investments or Causal INSIGHTS INSIDE for data mining to fight data tsunami and confounding.

References

External links
Jan Hajek Webpage

Dutch computer scientists
Czech computer scientists
Czech expatriates in the Netherlands
Year of birth missing (living people)
Living people